David Leggio (born July 31, 1984) is an American professional ice hockey goaltender who is currently an unrestricted free agent. He most recently played for Grizzlys Wolfsburg in the Deutsche Eishockey Liga (DEL).

Leggio is perhaps best known for a controversial play in which he intentionally dislodged his own net to force a play dead when faced against a two-man breakaway, forcing the American Hockey League to implement a rule change to prevent similar incidents. Leggio would employ a similar strategy in a Deutsche Eishockey Liga game a few years later, prompting the league to likewise implement a ban on the maneuver.

Playing career
Leggio played for four years at Clarkson University, where he amassed a record of 59–29–12 with a .922 save percentage and allowed an average of 2.3 goals per game. In his college career, he had 8 shutouts. At Clarkson, Leggio helped Clarkson win the Eastern College Athletic Conference tournament championship in 2007 and the Eastern College Athletic Conference regular season title in 2008.

Leggio's pro career began with an amateur tryout with the Binghamton Senators of the American Hockey League (AHL) at the end of the 2007–08 season, but for the 2008–09 season, he found himself with the Florida Everblades of the ECHL, sharing goaltending duties with Anton Khudobin on the way to winning the Brabham Cup as regular-season champions.

Leggio moved to Finland in 2009–10 to play for TPS in the top Finnish league, the SM-liiga, which bans net dislodging. Leggio played in 30 games in his season in Finland. He also played in 7 of TPS's playoff games, leading the league in postseason goals against average at 1.57 and helping TPS to the league title.

On August 8, 2010, Leggio returned to the United States, signing as a free agent to a one-year contract with the Portland Pirates of the AHL. Three months later, the Buffalo Sabres, the NHL team with which Portland was affiliated, converted Leggio's AHL contract to an NHL two-way contract, but kept Leggio in Portland. In 2010–11, he played 36 regular-season games for Portland and 9 in the postseason. Leggio was re-signed to the Sabres organization in June 2011, where he was assigned to the Rochester Americans (Buffalo changed minor-league affiliations from Portland to Rochester in 2011). Leggio saw action in 54 games for Rochester in the 2011–12 season, winning a career-high 28, but he went 0-3 in the postseason. Similarly, he saw 64 games for the Americans in the 2012–13 season, again winning a new career-high of 38, but also going 0-2 in the postseason.

On July 8, 2013, Leggio signed a one-year, two-way contract with the Washington Capitals organization. He spent the duration of the 2013–14 season with the Capitals AHL affiliate, the Hershey Bears.

On July 1, 2014, Leggio continued his journeyman career in signing a one-year two-way contract with the New York Islanders. During the 2014–15 season, on November 2, 2014 Leggio, at the time with the Isles' AHL affiliate Bridgeport Sound Tigers, earned a degree of notoriety for strategically dislodging his goal net during a two player breakaway, under the assumption that the penalty shot he would face as a result of the flagrant foul would be easier to defend than the breakaway (although, ironically, the 2-on-0 was swiftly marred by a mishandled pass during its fast-paced approach to the net). He stopped Dana Tyrell's penalty shot attempt as a penalty for dislodging the net. The league immediately passed a rule imposing a game misconduct penalty on any goaltender who attempted the move again.

On March 2, 2015, Leggio was traded by the Islanders to the Arizona Coyotes in exchange for Mark Louis; he was assigned to their AHL affiliate, in a return to the Portland Pirates.

As an unsigned free agent, Leggio accepted a tryout offer from the Winnipeg Jets on August 28, 2015. Upon his release from the Jets, Leggio opted for a second stint in Europe, agreeing to an initial one-year contract with German club EHC München of the DEL on October 22, 2015. While in Munich, Leggio pulled the same intentional dislodging of the goalposts (as the DEL had not yet outlawed the maneuver) in a game against the Fischtown Pinguins on December 9, 2017. The DEL changed its rules immediately thereafter, automatically awarding a goal if the net is intentionally dislodged. Leggio was also fined an undisclosed amount for the play.

Leggio suffered a severe concussion when he again attempted to dislodge his net during a March 3, 2018 game, ending his season. He briefly considered retirement but eventually recovered with the help of doctors in his hometown. He then signed with injury-hit Grizzlys Wolfsburg early in the season. Leggio collected 12 wins through 31 games in the 2018–19 season with Wolfsburg, leaving the club as a free agent on March 8, 2019.

International play
Leggio represented the United States at the 2018 Olympics.

Personal life

Leggio received a degree in business from Clarkson University in 2008. He started working as a business banking relationship manager at Five Star Bank in February 2020. He also owns a company that hosts instructional groups and clinics for aspiring ice hockey goaltenders.

Career statistics

Regular season and playoffs

International

Awards and honors

References

External links

1984 births
Living people
Albany River Rats players
American men's ice hockey goaltenders
Binghamton Senators players
Bridgeport Sound Tigers players
Clarkson University alumni
Clarkson Golden Knights men's ice hockey players
Florida Everblades players
Hershey Bears players
Ice hockey players at the 2018 Winter Olympics
Olympic ice hockey players of the United States
EHC München players
Ice hockey players from New York (state)
People from Williamsville, New York
Portland Pirates players
Rochester Americans players
HC TPS players
Grizzlys Wolfsburg players
St. Joseph's Collegiate Institute alumni